...Moji is the debut album by the 2005 Swiss MusicStar winner, Salome. Released on May 28, 2005, the album includes the Swiss number one single "Gumpu", as well as various other pop-orientated songs.

The album entered the charts on June 12, 2005 at #2, and stayed on the album chart for just under three months.

Track listing

2005 debut albums
Salome Clausen albums
German-language albums
Universal Music Group albums
Albums produced by Jolley & Swain